Jacobus Petrus "Os" du Randt (born 8 September 1972) is a former South African rugby union loosehead prop who retired as the most-capped forward in the history of the Springboks (a record since surpassed by John Smit, Victor Matfield and Tendai Mtawarira). For most of his career, he played in the domestic Currie Cup for the Free State Cheetahs, though he spent one season with the Blue Bulls. In Super Rugby, he represented the Free State Cheetahs when South Africa sent its top Currie Cup teams to the competition instead of franchised sides, later represented the Cats franchise (now known as the Lions), spent one season with the Bulls before returning to the Cats, and still later played for the Cheetahs. He ended his career as one of the last remaining international-level players from the amateur era of the sport and the last active member of the 1995 World Cup-winning squad. His final match was the 2007 Rugby World Cup final, which the Springboks won, with Du Randt playing the entire 80 minutes. He is one of 21 players who have won the Rugby World Cup on multiple occasions, only two of whom are South Africans.

Os (his Afrikaans nickname, which means Ox and refers to his big, muscular build) was a powerful scrummager and a hard worker around the field. He also had very good ball-handling skills for a prop, and his defence was solid.

Early career
Born 8 September 1972 in Elliot, South Africa, Du Randt made his first appearance for the Springboks in October 1994 against Argentina in a 42–22 victory, and he was a member of the 1995 World Cup squad, playing at loosehead prop in the final against New Zealand when South Africa won 15–12. Du Randt continued to be a key member of the Boks in the following years, and was named by Rugby World magazine as the second-best loosehead of all time in 1999. However, in 2000, at the age of 27, Du Randt suffered injuries that kept him out of rugby for nearly three years.

Comeback
In 2003, Du Randt received a phone call from former Springboks flanker and teammate Rassie Erasmus, who was coaching the Free State Cheetahs provincial team. The invitation did the trick, and Du Randt agreed to give it another shot.

Then in 2004, after an age-defying return to form in domestic play, du Randt was recalled to the Boks by new coach Jake White. He proved to be a key player in the Boks' 2004 revival, which saw them win the Tri Nations and be named as the IRB World Team of the Year.

"When I returned to rugby in 2003, it was to play for Free State and Free State alone," he recalled. "I didn't think I would wear the Springbok shirt again, ever in my life. When Jake White, the national coach, gave me the opportunity to play for my country once more, it felt like the first time all over again. I took some criticism in the media. There was a lot of stuff going around – most of it about me being too old.

In 2004, he received his 50th cap for the Springboks in a 32–16 loss to England at Twickenham. It was however, not to be a day to remember for him as, "du Randt was dismantled in the scrum, lock, stock and barrel, by England's Julian White". Droning chants of "Os...Os" have become commonplace at South African match venues since the big man made his return to Bok rugby.

And despite calls that he was getting too old , White persisted in selecting du Randt for the 2007 Rugby World Cup in France.

Later career

Following victories in pool play over England, Manu Samoa, and Tonga and a quarter-final win over Fiji and semi-final victory against Argentina, du Randt and his South African teammates found themselves in a rematch against defending champions England in the final. The favoured Springboks dethroned England 15–6 in a hard-fought final, with Os playing all 80 minutes which included one bullocking run in the first half.

Du Randt was the last active member of the South African 1995 Rugby World Cup-winning squad and retired as South Africa's third most-capped player ever and most-capped forward. He missed the 2003 tournament through injury but his comeback to help lead the Springboks to the 2007 Rugby World Cup is a fairy tale achievement.

When interviewed, du Randt said "I would have to say that I never thought I would bow out in a World Cup final, when I called it a day in 2000. To begin with a world title and to finish with another would be a real accomplishment, a memory that I will cherish for ever. I dedicate this to my best friend, Alex."

When questioned about his teammate, fellow Springbok prop CJ van der Linde said "Os is a legend in South African rugby. Even little children know who he is. His name will be mentioned for many years still," Van der Linde said. "We do not realise what impact he makes. One day, when he is old, we will know what great work he did for South Africa and what a leader he was."

Following the victory in the 2007 Rugby World Cup Final, Os announced his international retirement from the Springboks.

Du Randt returned to the sport for the 2009 Currie Cup season as a scrum coach for the Free State Cheetahs. In 2010, he took on the same position with the Springboks.

International statistics

Test Match record

Test tries (5)

World Cup matches
 Champions  Runners-up  Third place  Fourth place

Honors
 In 2019, World Rugby inducts Du Randt to its Hall of Fame, alongside Richie McCaw, Shiggy Konno, Peter Fatialofa, Graham Henry, and Diego Ormaechea.

See also
List of South Africa national rugby union players – Springbok no. 619

References

External links
 Os du Randt's fanpage
 
 Os Du Randt at sarugby.com
 Interview with the Independent in 2007
 – Interview in October 2007 with news24.com

1972 births
Living people
People from Sakhisizwe Local Municipality

People from the Free State (province)
Rugby union props
South African rugby union players
South Africa international rugby union players
Cheetahs (rugby union) players
Free State Cheetahs players
Bulls (rugby union) players
Lions (United Rugby Championship) players
Afrikaner people
Rugby union players from the Eastern Cape